Fear Not is a studio album by contemporary worship band Fearless BND. It was released on June 26, 2020 by Fearless International and BEC Recordings. They worked with Joshua O’Haire and Jeremy Johnson in the production of this album.

Critical reception 

Rating the album 6.7 stars for One Man in the Middle, Rob Allwright said, "The album Fear Not, is thankfully it is bolstered by a few good tracks at the beginning and end which show that they can write more complex and moving lyrics. One thing that is consistently good on this album is the vocals, they fit these songs really well with the different male and female leaders. This along with the fast-flowing nature of some of the songs means you can overlook the sometimes poorer writing and still very much enjoy the experience." Kevin Davis from New Release Today described Fear Not as "a truly anointed set of songs for the Church expressing a deep longing for Jesus".

Track listing

References 

2020 albums
Fearless BND albums